Robert Scade "Scotty" Rankine (January 6, 1909 – January 10, 1995) was a Canadian athlete who competed in the 1932 Summer Olympics and in the 1936 Summer Olympics.

He was born in Hamilton, South Lanarkshire, United Kingdom of Great Britain and Ireland and died in Wasaga Beach, Ontario.

In 1932 he finished eleventh in the Olympic 5000 metre event.

Four years later he was eliminated in the first round of the 5000 metre competition and he did not finish the 10000 metre contest at the 1936 Games.

At the 1934 Empire Games he won the silver medal in the 6 miles event and finished fourth in the 3 miles competition. He won again the silver medal in the 6 miles contest and also a bronze medal in the 3 miles event at the 1938 Empire Games.

External links
 sports-reference.com

1909 births
1995 deaths
Sportspeople from Hamilton, South Lanarkshire
Scottish emigrants to Canada
Canadian male long-distance runners
Olympic track and field athletes of Canada
Athletes (track and field) at the 1932 Summer Olympics
Athletes (track and field) at the 1936 Summer Olympics
Athletes (track and field) at the 1934 British Empire Games
Athletes (track and field) at the 1938 British Empire Games
Commonwealth Games silver medallists for Canada
Commonwealth Games bronze medallists for Canada
Commonwealth Games medallists in athletics
Medallists at the 1934 British Empire Games
Medallists at the 1938 British Empire Games